According to Kinopoisk, the highest-grossing Russian films are the following, as of early 2023.

This list does not include earlier Soviet films, which are listed separately on the list of highest-grossing films in the Soviet Union.

Overall list 
Up until the 2000s, the Russian box office was typically reported in terms of box office admissions (ticket sales), rather than gross revenue.

 Films that are currently in cinema

Most expensive Russian films 
Below is a list of the 12 most high-budget Russian films by production cost (excluding inflation).

See also
 List of Russian films
 Cinema of Russia

External links 

Russia
Lists of Russian films